Brito António Sozinho is an Angolan diplomat. He is currently the ambassador to Mozambique, Swaziland, Malawi and Madagascar. Sozinho previously served as the ambassador to Nigeria, Benin, Togo, Tanzania, Kenya, Uganda, Seychelles, Burundi, Guinea-Bissau, Senegal, and Sweden.

Sozinho was a part of the liberation struggle in Angola, and is a very influential diplomat in the Ministry of External Relation in Angola. He is one of wealthiest Angolans and has earned a stake in the country's highly lucrative oil industry.

During his time as Angola's representative to Guinea-Bissau, Sozinho was given the National Order of Merit of Co-operation and Development, which is Guinea-Bissau's highest award.

References

Angolan diplomats
Year of birth missing (living people)
Living people
Ambassadors of Angola to Guinea-Bissau
Ambassadors of Angola to Tanzania
Ambassadors of Angola to Kenya
Ambassadors of Angola to Uganda
Ambassadors of Angola to Seychelles
Ambassadors of Angola to Burundi